Theo Upt Hiddema (born 1 April 1944) is a Dutch lawyer, media personality and politician who served as a member of the House of Representatives from 2017 to 2020. A member of Forum for Democracy (FvD), he became a member of the Senate in 2021 following the resignation of Nicki Pouw-Verweij.

Early life 
Theo Hiddema was born on 1 April 1944 in Holwerd, Friesland.

Law 
Hiddema was accepted to the bar on 10 July 1975 in Maastricht. After an internship with Max Moszkowicz in Maastricht, he founded his own practice in 1981. There are currently two offices, one in Amsterdam and one in Maastricht.

Hiddema became known as a lawyer in several famous cases, one against Florentine Rost van Tonningen-Heubel, the widow of a Dutch national-socialist during World War II, and the case against the violent and criminal Venlo Gang.

Politics 
In 2016, Hiddema joined Forum for Democracy (FvD, Dutch: Forum voor Democratie), and was officially allocated a spot high on the electoral roll, second only to the founder and leader of the party, Thierry Baudet. Since FvD managed to get enough electoral votes for two seats in the House of Representatives in the 2017 Dutch general election, Hiddema became a member of the House of Representatives. In November 2020 Hiddema resigned as member of parliament due to "personal circumstances", possibly related to controversies within the party during that time. In December 2020, Hiddema expressed his willingness to stand again as a candidate for the party in March. However, just over a week removed from his announcement, he changed his mind and said he wanted to be removed from the list due to the party's populist approach of opposing the government's coronavirus strategy. In April 2021, he became a FvD senator.  In March 2022, he defected from the FvD alongside Paul Frentrop in response to the FvD refusing to attend Volodymyr Zelenskyy's address to the Dutch House of Representatives.

References

External links
 Law Office Hiddema
 Theo Hiddema at the Senate website
 Theo Hiddema at the Forum for Democracy website

1944 births
20th-century Dutch lawyers
Dutch political commentators
Forum for Democracy (Netherlands) politicians
Living people
Members of the House of Representatives (Netherlands)
People from Dongeradeel
21st-century Dutch lawyers